Luis Guillermo Pineda Rodas (born 1984, Guatemala) is a global studies expert, social scientist and entrepreneur. He has a MA, MSc from Leipzig University and Roskilde University. From 2009-2011 he worked at the Center for the Study of Capitalism as founder and executive director.

Education

Pineda holds a BA degree in international relations with a specialization in international commerce from Francisco Marroquín University (2008), an MA degree in global studies from the Global and European Studies Institute at Leipzig University (2013) and a MSc degree in global studies from the Department of Society and Globalisation at Roskilde University (2013).  He also completed studies for an MA degree in social sciences from Francisco Marroquín University (2011).  During his studies of a master's degree in social sciences, Pineda founded the Center for the Study of Capitalism in cooperation with his alma mater Francisco Marroquín University.

Research

Pineda's scholarly work develops across the disciplines of global studies, urban history, sociology, politics, Objectivist philosophy and global history. His research has been published in a variety of social science magazines and journals, including The National Catholic Reporter, Comparative Studies in Society and History, Journal of Modern Italian Studies, etc. He has written non-scholarly articles for the online blogs since 2005.

His MSc research is related to the Libertarian Free Cities in a global studies focus.  This project is the first academic research in the field of large scale city-building projects in Latin America.  He has also examined how cultural and national identities are constructed through conflicting collective memories in a political and cultural environment defined by historically changing borders and discourses in Guinea-Bissau and India.

After his MA from Leipzig University, Pineda has engaged various areas of research. He writes and publishes on urban history and city-building from a global studies perspective.

Pineda worked as a teacher of Objectivist philosophy with high school and undergraduate students from 2009-11.  He completed three and a half years of study at the Objectivist Academic Center.  He has lectured at international conferences on the history of capitalism and currently does research related to urban anthropology and global studies at Roskilde University. In 2010 he edited an ebook version of Frederic Bastiat's essay The Law.

Pineda is principally interested in how social sciences ideas and approaches can inform global political and global social theory in the study of contemporary politics and contemporary history.

In recent work Pineda has sought to develop an anthropological approach to city-building and Saskia Sassen's global cities. In 2013 he published a project studying the military coup staged by Guinea-Bissau’s army on the evening of 12 April 2012 and its linkage to foreign and local drug barons. Pineda proposed in his project that Guinea-Bissau should be recognized as the first legitimate narco-state in Africa and the world.

Via participation in the yearly held Atlas Summit in Washington, DC, Pineda has also taken an interest in Ayn Rand's philosophy and the methodological applications of Rand's philosophy to the study of global history and the history of capitalism.

His current research in Denmark involves the history of anthropological thought in the study of urbanism, and the connections between global approaches to social theory.

Teaching career
Pineda taught a broad spectrum of Socratic dialogues at Francisco Marroquín University while working as executive director of the Center for the Study of Capitalism. These included areas such as: Objectivist philosophy, history of liberty, free market economics, sociology, and politics. His career includes over ten years of experience in teaching and student advising at institutions in Latin America.

 Course: “Atlas Shrugged and Objectivist Philosophy”. Center for the Study of Capitalism.  UFM, Guatemala. September, 2009-August, 2011.  Taught more than 100 classes to 105 high school students in Guatemala City.
 Course: “The Fountainhead and Objectivist Philosophy”. Center for the Study of Capitalism.  UFM, Guatemala. September, 2009-August, 2011. Taught 256 classes to 426 high school students in Guatemala City.
 Course: “Philosophy Book Club”. Center for the Study of Capitalism.  UFM, Guatemala. September, 2009-August, 2011. Taught 75 classes to 732 college and high school students in Guatemala City on the books Not a Zero Sum Game by Manuel Ayau, Economics in One Lesson by Henry Hazlitt, Common * Sense Economics by Charles Murray, Human Action by Ludwig von Mises, The Law by Frederic Bastiat, and dozens more classical fiction books.
 Course: “Research Strategies for EBSCO, Xrefer, Ovid, Oxford Reference Online and Project MUSE”. Ludwig von Mises Library, Guatemala. March 2005, February 2007. Taught  86 sessions on how to do advanced research on online databases for college students.
 Course: “Historical and Political Geography”. Teacher Assistant of Prof. Glenn Cox. Universidad Francisco Marroquin, Guatemala. January, 2004 – June, 2004.

Business life
Pineda was the founder of Corporacion de Kioskos y Tiendas in 2009.  Pineda grew the business from three to ten stores in one and a half years, and managed the imports of the company and controlled inventory. Led payment of imports taxes and form controls. Pineda met the targets and earning profits for the 2009-2011 behind growing the business to record sales of 600% increase in the cellphone targets and 400% increase in the telecom accessories’ targets.  Pineda was awarded with the Power 30 Under 30 Honoree prize of 2012 for being an outstanding individual under the age of thirty around the world that have achieved extraordinary success as business entrepreneurs and education.

Awards and honors

2012 - Power 30 Under 30 Honoree
2008 - 2nd place Contest "Voces de Libertad"
2006 - Charles G. Koch Fellowship

References

External links 
 Roskilde University's published projects: 
 Interview with Guillermo Pineda CSC's Executive Director (2009-11) by Prensa Libre, Guatemala's largest newspaper
 Guillermo Pineda, exitoso y menor de 30 años
 Roskilde University
 Leipzig University
 Francisco Marroquin University
 Center for the Study of Capitalism
 

1984 births
Guatemalan academics
Guatemalan businesspeople
Guatemalan essayists
Male essayists
Guatemalan journalists
Male journalists
Guatemalan people of Spanish descent
Guatemalan politicians
Guatemalan novelists
Male novelists
21st-century Guatemalan historians
Guatemalan male writers
Living people
Leipzig University alumni
Roskilde University alumni
Universidad Francisco Marroquín alumni
Academic staff of Universidad Francisco Marroquín